Josiah Oldfield  (28 February 1863 – 2 February 1953) was an English lawyer, physician and promoter of his own variant of fruitarianism which was virtually indistinguishable from lacto-ovo vegetarianism. He became a versatile author, a prolific writer of popular books on dietary and health topics.

Early life

The son of David Oldfield of Ryton, Shropshire, a provision dealer, and his wife Margaret Bates, he was born on 28 February 1863 in Shrewsbury. His father, who died in 1903, was a church organist in nearby Condover from around the time of Josiah's birth.

Oldfield was educated at Newport Grammar School. He then taught as an assistant master at Chipping Campden School.

Matriculating in 1882 at the University of Oxford as a non-collegiate student, Oldfield graduated B.A. in 1885, with second-class honours in civil law and theology. While there, he became a vegetarian and concluded meat-eating was unnecessary. He was called to the bar by Lincoln's Inn, and practised as a barrister on the Oxford court circuit. He then studied medicine at St. Bartholomew's Hospital Medical School and qualified in 1897.

Oldfield and vegetarianism
Oldfield was President of the West London Food Reform Society, a vegetarian group based in Bayswater, founded in 1891. Edwin Arnold was vice-President and Mohandas Gandhi was Secretary. Oldfield met Gandhi through Pranjivan Mehta, in 1890, and the two became friends, sharing rooms in Bayswater for some months in 1891.

Further, Oldfield was associated with the London Vegetarian Society (LVS) and editor for their publication, The Vegetarian. He was also the secretary of the Vegetarian Federal Union. He was a member of the Order of the Golden Age and the Humanitarian League.

In 1895, Oldfield searched for alternatives to leather for boots, experimenting with boots made from India rubber, gutta-percha, and asbestos. He found faults with all of those substances, but expressed optimism about a "vegetarian" boot. That year he submitted a paper on vegetarian boots to the autumn congress of the Vegetarian Federal Union held in Birmingham.

The entry "Vegetarianism" in the Encyclopædia Britannica (11th edition, 1911) was written by Oldfield; but he did not identify as a vegetarian. He stated that "I object absolutely to vegetarianism, because the word smacks of onions and cabbage. It gives people the idea that you live on watercress and browse on odds and ends of garbage." He identified himself as Aristophagist, which he described as "eaters of the best - men and women who refuse to eat the common garbage of the undeveloped."

Fruitarianism
Oldfield advocated for fruitarianism, putting him at odds with the Vegetarian Society. He was a member of the Fruitarian Society, whose members lived on "the produce of harvest field, garden, forest and orchard, with milk, butter, cheese, eggs and honey". His own "fruitarianism" was close to ovo-lacto vegetarianism. He was not a vegan: he recommended a daily diet of dandelion leaves, eggs, grapes, honey, lettuce, milk, salad, and watercress. He opposed slaughterhouses and vivisection.

A reviewer in 1909 noted that "as fruitarian dietary includes milk, butter, eggs, cheese, and honey, along with fruits, nuts, and vegetables, healthy existence is quite possible for Dr Oldfield and his followers." A recipe of his "Margaret Plum Pudding" was included in Cecilia Maria de Candia's cookbook, The Kitchen Garden and the Cook (1913). In 1931, Oldfield commented that "I am proud to say that the only point on which we of the Fruitarian Society disagree with Mr. Gandhi is that Mr. Gandhi will not eat eggs, because they contain Life."

Hospital founder
While he was a medical student, Oldfield was involved with the Oriolet Hospital, founded in 1895 in Loughton, Essex. It required vegetarianism of its patients. The hospital was endorsed by the Order of the Golden Age, and partly funded by Arnold Hills. Oldfield admitted patients there, initially employed with title Warden, supported by a medical officer. Gertrude Hick, the nurse whom Oldfied later married, was trained in London and appointed sister in charge at the hospital in early 1895. By 1904 it had become the Oriolet Hygienic Home of Rest and Open Air Cottage Hospital, run by Florence Booth for the Salvation Army.

In 1897 Oldfield announced the foundation of the Hospital of St Francis in South London, on anti-vivisection principles. It had up to a dozen beds, in a converted town house on New Kent Road, and gave out-patient care. It closed around 1904, its funding being transferred to Battersea General Hospital. Oldfield was senior physician to the Lady Margaret Fruitarian Hospital in Bromley, which he founded in 1903.

Oldfield also founded the fruitarian Margaret Manor hospital in Doddington, Kent. No alcohol, fish or meat was permitted at the Hospital; the food was cooked in coconut oil.

Army surgeon
Oldfield shared the pacifist views of the Order of the Golden Age. In 1898, he joined the Essex Regiment, 1st Volunteer Battalion as an Army Surgeon with rank of Lieutenant, serving to 1901. He later in 1913, with rank of Major, criticised the absence of standard training for Regimental Medical Officers of the Territorial Army. During World War I, he held a commission as Lieutenant-Colonel of the 3rd East Anglian Field Ambulance Corps, a Territorial in the Royal Army Medical Corps., raising and commanding a casualty clearing station that served at the Western Front, for which he was mentioned in despatches. His service came to an end in 1918, when he was thrown from a horse. He was awarded the Territorial Decoration.

Legal reformer
In 1901, the University of Oxford awarded Oldfield a doctorate in civil law for his thesis on capital punishment. The Penalty of Death, it combined criminological, legal and sociological arguments to call for abolition of the death penalty. He founded the  Society for the Abolition of Capital Punishment in the same year. He became chairman of the Romilly Society, a pressure group for penal reform founded in 1897, in 1910.

India
Oldfield subscribed to Catherine Impey's periodical Anti-Caste. He made an investigative visit to India in 1901. His personal connections to India included contacts in Kathiawar. This was the home area of his friend Gandhi, born at Porbandar; and best man at his wedding in 1899 was Trimbakrai Jadavrai Desai, then a law student at Gray's Inn in London, from Limbdi State of the Kathiawar Agency. His experiences formed the material of a series of articles in The Leisure Hour. One of them related to Bhavnagar State in eastern Kathiawar, and a visit where he was accompanied by Prabhashankar Pattani. In April 1903 Oldfield published in the Hibbert Journal an article "The Failure of Christian Missions in India".

Later life
Oldfield became a fellow of the Royal Society of Medicine in 1920. He died in 1953 at the age of 89, in Doddington, Kent.

Views

In 1891, Oldfield attempted to convert Gandhi to Anglicanism, urging him to read the Bible. By the 20th century he had changed his own views. In 1904, he commented that "as a medical man, seeing much of pain and suffering and dying, my experience does not lead me to think that it is the profession of the Christian creed which is by any means the sole method of securing happiness of soul in this world, or which removes the fear of passing on to the next."

Oldfield concluded that a "wider conception of God" was needed. He is listed in A Biographical Dictionary of Modern Rationalists as a theist with mystic ideas about the soul. He was a proponent of evolution conceived as based on cooperation rather than competition.

Selected publications

Tuberculosis: Or Flesh Eating a Cause of Consumption (1897)
The Penalty of Death: Or, the Problem of Capital Punishment (1901)
Essays of the Golden Age (1902)
The Penny Guide to Fruitarian Diet and Cookery (1902)
Myrrh and Amaranth (1905)
The Value of Fruit as Food (1906)

The Raisin Cure (1923)
Fasting for Health and Life (1924)
The Dry Diet Cure (1925)
Get Well and Keep Well (1926)
Eat and Get Well (1927)
Eat and Keep Young (1928)
Eat and Be Happy (1929)
Healing and the Conquest of Pain (1944)
The Mystery of Birth (1949)
My Friend Gandhi (Reminiscences of Gandhiji, 1951)
The Mystery of Death (1951)
A Popular Guide to Fruitarian Diet and Cookery (1952)

Quotes

Family
Oldfield married Gertrude Hick on 29 September 1899 at Wakefield Cathedral; she was the daughter of Matthew Bussey Hick of Wakefield, and sister of the doctor Henry Hick. They had twin daughters in 1902; but their marriage was not successful and they separated. He had two daughters named Josie: Josie Margaret Oldfield, with Irene Doreen Oldfield one of the twins; and Josie Magdalen Oldfield, born 1906 and identified in the 1911 census. The latter, a cradle fruitarian, was qualified medically from 1933. Dr. Josie M. Oldfield survived him.

References

External links

Dr. Josiah Oldfield (The Order of the Golden Age)
Lady Margaret Hospital (Lost Hospitals of London)
Josiah Oldfield at the Imperial War Museum

1863 births
1953 deaths
19th-century English lawyers
19th-century English medical doctors
20th-century English lawyers
20th-century English medical doctors
Alumni of the Medical College of St Bartholomew's Hospital
Alumni of the University of Oxford
Anti-vivisectionists
British anti–death penalty activists
British vegetarianism activists
English animal rights scholars
English food writers
Fellows of the Royal College of Physicians
Fellows of the Royal College of Surgeons
Members of Lincoln's Inn
People associated with the Order of the Golden Age
People associated with the Vegetarian Society
People educated at Newport Free Grammar School
People from Doddington, Kent
Writers from Shrewsbury
Royal Army Medical Corps officers
Vegetarian cookbook writers
Medical doctors from Shrewsbury